Buronga may refer to:
Buronga, New South Wales
Buronga, Sudan